Parelli, Parrelli or Parellis may refer to:

People
Apostolos Parellis (born 1985), Cypriot athlete
Attilio Parelli (1874–1944), Italian composer
Josie Parrelli, Australian radio DJ
Pat Parelli (born 1954), American horse trainer
Parelli Natural Horsemanship

Characters
Dave Parelli in TV series Rude Awakening
Doug Parelli in TV series Soul Food
Vinnie Parelli in 1974 TV movie The Last Angry Man, played by Del Russell